"Ganadara" is a song by Korean-American singer Jay Park featuring singer IU. It was released on March 11, 2022, through More Vision and distributed by Kakao Entertainment. It peaked at number one on the Gaon Digital Chart.

Recording 
"Ganadara" was recorded in 2020 but was released in 2022 as Jay Park "wanted to release it at the right time, when I could prepare for it properly and have the [right] time and condition for it."

Music and lyrics 
According to IZM, "Jay Park sings "Teach me tonight Ga-na-da-ra-ma-ba-sa" which reflects his real self who is not fluent in Korean. The soft R&B melody and lyrics that capture him being nervous in front of his love interest fit well with his image."

Music video 
The music video for "Ganadara" accompanied the song's release. It comically depicts the process where Jay Park asks IU to appear in the video.

Critical reception 
Park Sujin of IZM rated "Ganadara" 3.5 out of 5 stars. According to Park, it is a "good pop song" that "perfectly reflects Jay Park's bizarre, cute, but hot personality."

Charts

Weekly charts

Year-end charts

References 

2022 singles
2022 songs
Billboard Korea K-Pop number-one singles
Gaon Digital Chart number-one singles
IU (singer) songs
Jay Park songs
Korean-language songs
South Korean pop songs